Alexander M. Cruickshank (December 13, 1919 – June 10, 2017) was an American chemist and long-serving director of the Gordon Research Conferences.

Biography
Alexander M. Cruickshank was born in Marlborough, New Hampshire .  He took his B.S. in chemistry at Rhode Island State College in 1943. While working at Rhode Island State College as an instructor he earned his M.S. in chemistry in 1945. He earned his Ph.D. in chemistry from the University of Massachusetts in 1954.  Cruickshank served on the chemistry faculty at the University of Rhode Island from 1953 to 1982 and was Chair of the Chemistry Department from 1976 until his 1982 retirement.  He also served as director of the Gordon Research Conferences from 1968 until his retirement in 1993. Cruickshank lived in South Kingstown, Rhode Island until his death.

Legacy
Since 1994, the Alexander M. Cruickshank Lectureship Award has been bestowed annually to the most highly distinguished scientists presenting their research at the Gordon Research Conferences.  Typically, there is one such lectureship annually for each of the principal subdisciplines of the Conferences, namely the Biological, Chemical, and Physical Sciences. At its discretion, the Gordon Research Conferences Board of Directors may occasionally elect additional Alexander M. Cruickshank lecturers.

References

1919 births
2017 deaths
American chemists
People from Marlborough, New Hampshire
People from South Kingstown, Rhode Island
University of Rhode Island faculty
University of Massachusetts Amherst alumni